St John's Hampton Wick is a Grade II listed Church of England church on Church Grove and St John's Road in Hampton Wick, in the  London Borough of Richmond upon Thames. It was built to a design by Edward Lapidge in 1829–30.

History
St John's was originally conceived as a chapel of ease to the parish church of St Mary at Hampton about 2½ miles away, but following its completion, the district assigned to it was made a separate parish. The Church Commissioners funded its construction on the condition that the parish church should also be enlarged at the same time. The cost of the church and the enclosure of the site was about £4,500. The first stone was laid on  7 October 1829, and the building was completed by 8 November 1830.

The building's architect Edward Lapidge also donated the land for it, and paid for the enclosure of the site on one side. Lapidge  had been  born in Hampton Wick, and designed the present Kingston Bridge nearby.

It was built in a plain Gothic Revival style, faced with Suffolk brick and Bath stone. It was intended to seat 800 people, half the accommodation being free (i.e. not subject to pew rent). A chancel was added in 1887 and the church was restored in 1880 and 1911.

In 2010, after five years of closure, the church re-opened its doors under the Church of England's church planting scheme. Services were resumed in December 2010.

Services
Services are held twice on Sunday mornings plus on Sunday evenings. The church describes its services as "informal, modern and family friendly’' within the Church of England.

References

External links

1829 establishments in England
19th-century Church of England church buildings
Hampton Wick
Diocese of London
Edward Lapidge church buildings
Grade II listed churches in the London Borough of Richmond upon Thames
Hampton Wick
Holy Trinity Brompton plants